The 2014 FIA WTCC Race of Slovakia was the fourth round of the 2014 World Touring Car Championship season and the third running of the FIA WTCC Race of Slovakia. It was held on 11 May 2014 at the Automotodróm Slovakia Ring in Orechová Potôň, Slovakia.

Race one was won by Sébastien Loeb for Citroën Total WTCC. Race two was cancelled due to heavy rain, the first time a race had been cancelled in the history of the World Touring Car Championship.

Background
Coming into the event José María López was leading the drivers' championship by ten points over teammate Yvan Muller. Franz Engstler led the Yokohama Trophy.

No changes were made to the compensation weight system after the Hungarian round.

Petr Fulín returned the championship with Campos Racing, driving a TC2 SEAT León WTCC. NIKA Racing and their driver Yukinori Taniguchi withdrew their entry at the last minute.

Report

Testing and free practice
López was quickest in Friday testing, nearly nine–tenths faster than the Honda of Tiago Monteiro. Hugo Valente was the highest placed Chevrolet driver while the quickest Lada driver was Robert Huff in 14th place.

In the first practice session on Saturday morning it was López who topped the times once again. The session was stopped a minute early after Huff stopped on track with electrical problems in his Lada Granta 1.6T.

López completed his domination of practice by setting the pace in the second free practice session. An off for Tom Coronel sent the ROAL Motorsport driver through the gravel while Huff continued to have technical problems but managed to set the 14th fastest time.

Qualifying
Norbert Michelisz was quickest in the first part of qualifying. Proteam Racing's Mehdi Bennani failed to set a time after technical problems prevented him from getting out onto the track for most of the session. Lukoil Lada Sport's Mikhail Kozlovskiy also failed to set a time. Sébastien Loeb almost failed to progress through to the second session when his car required attention in the pits having only set a banker lap on used tyres. He got out just before the end of the session and set a quick enough to time to progress despite his engine cutting–out just before the finish line.

López was back at the top of the timing sheets in second part of qualifying, a session which was disrupted by a red flag. The bonnet on Gabriele Tarquini's Honda flew open and he went off the track with Monteiro and Huff following him off the circuit. Michelisz was the only Honda driver to get through the Q3 along with the three Citroën drivers and Münnich Motorsport's Gianni Morbidelli. Monteiro ended the session tenth and took pole position on the reversed grid for race two.

López took pole position in Q3 and led a Citroën 1–2–3 with Loeb second and Muller third. Michelisz ended up fourth ahead of Morbidelli.

Race One
The race started on a wet track with rain falling at the start. Loeb moved into the lead at the start with Michelisz moving up to third behind López. Engstler went off on the first lap while Huff got himself up into the top ten after a good start. By the second lap Loeb and López were breaking away from the rest of the field with the third Citroën of Muller chasing Michelisz briefly before he went into the pits to serve a drive–through penalty for a jump start. Both Dušan Borković and Mehdi Bennani slipped in the wet conditions on lap three, Borković holding the slide while Bennani dipped off the circuit. Muller who was now climbing back up through the field after his penalty was the next to have a minor off in the wet conditions. Borković then had another off on lap four, going through the gravel and pulling part of the rear bumper on his Chevrolet RML Cruze TC1 off in the process. Nearer the front the battle for fourth place was between the ROAL Motorsport drivers, Tom Coronel eventually managed to pass Tom Chilton on lap five. By lap six the conditions on the track had got much wetter with cars becoming unstable on the main straight. The wetter conditions handed the advantage to the Lada cars with Huff engaging in a battle for eighth with Tarquini before the safety car came out. Three laps were completed behind the safety car to reach minimum race distance of 75 percent. The race was eventually red flagged on lap nine and Loeb declared the winner.

Prior to the Race of Austria, Lukoil Lada Sport's James Thompson was disqualified from the previous three races after the seal on his engine was found to have been broken without permission. This included both races in Hungary and the race in Slovakia.

Race Two
After race one was stopped early due to heavy rain, the decision was taken to cancel race two. The heavy rain meant the medical helicopter was unable to take off and the fading light were contributing factors to the decision.

Results

Qualifying

Bold denotes Pole position for second race.

Race 1

Bold denotes Fastest lap.

Standings after the event

Drivers' Championship standings

Yokohama Trophy standings

Manufacturers' Championship standings

 Note: Only the top five positions are included for both sets of drivers' standings.

References

External links
World Touring Car Championship official website

Slovakia
FIA WTCC Race of Slovakia
FIA WTCC Race of Slovakia